Parliamentary elections were held in Poland in 1989 to elect members of the Sejm and the recreated Senate. The first round took place on 4 June, with a second round on 18 June. They were the first elections in the country since the Communist Polish United Workers Party abandoned its monopoly of power in April 1989.

Not all parliamentary seats were contested, but the resounding victory of the Solidarity opposition in the freely contested races paved the way to the end of communist rule in Poland. Solidarity won all of the freely contested seats in the Sejm, and all but one seat in the entirely freely contested Senate. In the aftermath of the elections, Poland became the first country of the Eastern Bloc in which democratically elected representatives gained real power. Although the elections were not entirely democratic, they led to the formation of a government led by Tadeusz Mazowiecki and a peaceful transition to democracy in Poland and elsewhere in Central and Eastern Europe.

Background
In May and August 1988 massive waves of workers' strikes broke out in the Polish People's Republic. The strikes, as well as street demonstrations, continued throughout spring and summer, ending in early September 1988. These actions shook the communist regime of the country to such an extent that it decided to begin talking about recognising Solidarity (Polish: Solidarność), an "unofficial" labor union that subsequently grew into a political movement. As a result, later that year, the regime decided to negotiate with the opposition, which opened the way for the 1989 Round Table Agreement. The second, much bigger wave of strikes (August 1988) surprised both the government and top leaders of Solidarity, who were not expecting actions of such intensity. These strikes were mostly organized by local activists, who had no idea that their leaders from Warsaw had already started secret negotiations with the communists.

An agreement was reached by the communist Polish United Workers' Party (PZPR) and the Solidarity movement during the Round Table negotiations. The final agreement was signed on 4 April 1989, ending communist rule in Poland. As a result, real political power was vested in a newly created bicameral legislature (the Sejm, with the recreated Senate), whilst the office of president was re-established. Solidarity became a legitimate and legal political party: On 7 April 1989 the existing parliament changed the election law and changed the constitution (through the April Novelization), and on 17 April, the Supreme Court of Poland registered Solidarity. Soon after the agreement was signed, Solidarity leader Lech Wałęsa travelled to Rome to be received by the Polish Pope John Paul II.

Perhaps the most important decision reached during the Round Table talks was to allow for partially free elections to be held in Poland. (A fully free election was promised "in four years"). All seats in the newly recreated Senate of Poland were to be elected democratically, as were 161 seats (35 percent of the total) in Sejm. The remaining 65% of the seats in the Sejm were reserved for the PZPR and its satellite parties (United People's Party (ZSL), Alliance of Democrats (SD), and communist-aligned Catholic parties). These seats were still technically elected, but only government-sponsored candidates were allowed to compete for them. In addition, all 35 seats elected via the country-wide list were reserved for the PZPR's candidates provided they gained a certain quota of support. This was to ensure that the most notable leaders of the PZPR were elected.

The outcome of the election was largely unpredictable, and pre-electoral opinion polls were inconclusive. After all, Poland had not had a truly fair election since the 1920s, so there was little precedent to go by. The last contested elections were those of 1947, in the midst of communist-orchestrated violent oppression and electoral fraud. This time, there would be open and relatively fair competition for many seats, both between communist and Solidarity candidates, and, in some cases, between various communist candidates. Although censorship was still in force, the opposition was allowed to campaign much more freely than before, thanks to a new newspaper, Gazeta Wyborcza, and the reactivation of Tygodnik Solidarność. Solidarity was also given access to televised media, being allocated 23% of electoral time on Polish Television. There were also no restrictions on financial support. Although the Communists were clearly unpopular, there were no hard numbers as to how low support for them would actually fall. A rather flawed survey carried out in April, days after the Round Table Agreement was signed, suggested that over 60% of the surveyed wanted Solidarity to cooperate with the government. Another survey a week later, regarding the Senate elections, showed that 48% of the surveyed supported the opposition, 14% supported the communist government, and 38% were undecided. In such a situation, both sides faced another unfamiliar aspect - the electoral campaign. The communists knew they were guaranteed 65% of the seats, and expected a difficult but winnable contest; in fact they were concerned about a possibility of "winning too much" - they desired some opposition, which would serve to legitimize their government both internally and internationally. The communist government still had control over most major media outlets and employed sports and television celebrities as candidates, as well as successful local personalities. Some members of the opposition were worried that such tactics would gain enough votes from the less educated segment of the population to give the communists the legitimacy that they craved. Only a few days before June 4, the party Central Committee was discussing the possible reaction of the Western world should Solidarity not win a single seat. At the same time, the Solidarity leaders were trying to prepare some set of rules for the non-party MPs in a communist-dominated parliament, as it was expected that the party would not win more than 20 seats. Solidarity was also complaining that the way electoral districts were drawn was not favourable towards it.

Results

The outcome was a major surprise to both the PZPR and Solidarity. Solidarity's electoral campaign was much more successful than expected. It won a landslide victory, winning all but one of the 100 seats in the Senate, and all of the contested seats in the Sejm; the sole seat in the Senate which was not won by Solidarity was won by an independent candidate. Out of 35 seats in the country-wide list in which Solidarity was not allowed to compete, only one was gained by PZPR candidate (Adam Zieliński) and one by a ZSL satellite party candidate in the first round; none of the others attained the required 50% majority. The communists regained some seats during the second round, but the first round was highly humiliating to them, the psychological impact of it has been called "shattering". Government-supported candidates competing against Solidarity members gained 10 to 40% of votes in total, varying by constituency. Altogether, out of 161 seats eligible, Solidarity took all 161 (160 in the first round and one more in the second). In the 161 districts in which opposition candidates competed against pro-government candidates, the opposition candidates obtained 71.3% of the vote (16,397,600). 

While Solidarity having secured the 35% of seats available to it, the remaining 65% was divided between the PZPR and its satellite parties (37.6% to PZPR, 16.5% to ZSL, 5.8% to SD, with 4% distributed between small communist-aligned Catholic parties, PAX and UChS). The distribution of seats among the PZPR and its allies was known beforehand.

Voter turnout was surprisingly low: only 62.7% in the first round and 25% in the second. The second round, with the exception of one district, was a contest between two most popular pro-government candidates. This explains low turnout in the second round as pro-opposition voters (the majority of the electorate) had limited interest in these races.

Sejm

Senate

Aftermath
The magnitude of the Communist coalition's defeat was so great that there were initially fears that either the PZPR or the Kremlin would annul the results. However, PZPR general secretary Wojciech Jaruzelski allowed the results to stand. He and his colleagues felt secure with the 65% of the seats it was guaranteed for itself and its traditional allies. On 19 July the Sejm elected Jaruzelski as president by only one vote. In turn, he nominated General Czesław Kiszczak for prime minister; they intended for Solidarity to be given a few token positions for appearances. However, this was undone when Solidarity's leaders convinced the PZPR's longtime satellite parties, the ZSL and SD (some of whose members already owed a debt to Solidarity for endorsing them during the second round) to switch sides and support a Solidarity-led coalition government. The PZPR, which had 37.6% of the seats, suddenly found itself in a minority. Abandoned by Moscow, Kiszczak resigned on 14 August. With no choice but to appoint a Solidarity member as prime minister, on 24 August Jaruzelski appointed Solidarity activist Tadeusz Mazowiecki as head of a Solidarity-led coalition, ushering a brief period described as "Your president, our prime minister".

The elected parliament was known as the Contract Sejm, from the "contract" between the Solidarity and the communist government which made it possible in the first place.

Although the elections were not entirely democratic they paved the way for the Sejm's approval of Mazowiecki's cabinet on 13 September and a peaceful transition to democracy, which was confirmed after the presidential election of 1990 (in which Lech Wałęsa replaced Jaruzelski as president) and the parliamentary elections of 1991.

On the international level, this election is seen as one of the major milestones in the fall of communism ("Autumn of Nations") in Central and Eastern Europe.

However, Solidarity did not stay in power long, and quickly fractured, resulting in it being replaced by other parties. In this context, the 1989 elections are often seen as the vote against communism, rather than for Solidarity.

See also
 History of Poland (1945-1989)
 History of Solidarity
 Thick line
 Balcerowicz plan

References

Poland
1989 elections in Poland
Parliamentary elections in Poland
Solidarity (Polish trade union)
June 1989 events in Europe
Elections in the Polish People's Republic
Election and referendum articles with incomplete results